The 1971 Iowa State Cyclones football team represented Iowa State University in the Big Eight Conference during the 1971 NCAA University Division football season. In their fourth year under head coach Johnny Majors, the Cyclones compiled an 8–4 record (4–3 against conference opponents), finished in fourth place in the conference, and outscored opponents by a combined total of 337 to 250. They played their home games at Clyde Williams Field in Ames, Iowa.

Dean Carlson, Ray Harm, and Keith Schroeder were the team captains.

Schedule

References

Iowa State
Iowa State Cyclones football seasons
Iowa State Cyclones football